Big Brother 2021 is the first cooperation season of the Dutch and Belgian version of Big Brother. It is the seventh regular version of Big Brother in both Belgium and the Netherlands. The show is broadcast on RTL5 in the Netherlands and VIER (the channel rebranded as Play4 on 28 January 2021) in Belgium beginning on 3 January 2021. Live streams are available 24/7 on Videoland for Dutch viewers and on VIER(later GoPlay.be) and Telenet for Belgian viewers.

On 7 June 2020, it was announced by RTL that there would be a new Dutch season of Big Brother after an absence of 14 years to celebrate the 20th anniversary of the first Big Brother ever. On 23 July 2020, it was announced that it would be a cooperation with Belgian broadcaster SBS België, making it the first cooperated Big Brother season with housemates from both Netherlands and Belgium and the first Belgian season in 13 years.

Geraldine Kemper and Peter Van de Veire are co-hosts of the show. The show began airing on 4 January 2021. Eight housemates entered the house on launch night on New Year's Eve, 31 December 2020. The reception of the premiere episode of the season - "De Start" was successful, with more than 1.3 million viewers in the Netherlands and over 500,000 viewers in Belgium.

The final was on 8 April 2021 and the winner was Jill Goede. There was some controversy because the voting websites crashed because of high demand during the final vote. The bailiff declared the winner consulting the last intermediate score. The final was watched by 488.000 viewers in the Netherlands and 401.062 viewers in Belgium. The Belgian broadcaster Play4 called the season a modest hit with 378.00 daily viewers and 10 million views at the website. A new season was teased during the final.

Production

Format 
Big Brother 2021 followed the same format as the previous season of the program. Housemates lived in isolation from the outside world in a custom-built house for a period of 100 days, hoping to be the last one to leave the house as the winner, and walk away with a large cash prize.

Concept
Producers of the reality show called the comeback of the show a necessity in times where reality was filtered, enhanced and changed by social media. The show states that it would expose the housemates like they truly are. During the show Big Brother shared messages, pictures or videos posted by the housemates on their personal social media before their stay in the house with all the housemates.

This season was a reintroduction of Big Brother in both Netherlands and Belgium, it was again promoted as a social experiment.

Broadcasts 
The premiere show is known as De Start (lit. The Start) was pre-recorded on the evening of 31 December 2020 and simultaneously broadcast on RTL4 and RTL5 in the Netherlands, VIER on Belgium on 4 January 2021. The show aired from Monday to Friday with the live show on Thursday night.

During the live shows, there were experts who gave their views about the interactions in the house. These experts were psychologist Kas Stuyf, sexologist Lotte Vanwezemael and social media expert Diederik Broekhuizen.

House 
A new house was built in Amsterdam, next to the Johan Cruyff Arena at a parking lot of Endemol Shine Nederland in a few months. It was a 300 m2 House and had 125 cameras installed (100 indoor cameras and 25 outdoor cameras) and 39 speakers.

Changes 
Unlike in previous Big Brother seasons, there were changes to minimise controversies that occasionally happen on the Big Brother series. Firstly, during the house tour, it was announced that the cameras in the showers would only be used if it was needed for character or interaction progress and not for voyeurism. Additionally, there was a change in the sexual activity that happens inside the Big Brother house. The rule was made between the producer and the housemates, in which the housemates are allowed to have sex with each other only if both housemates show their thumbs up towards the camera. The housemates can only receive beer and wine in small quantities on special occasions or weekends. The production team hopes that this will prevent untoward incidents that eventually cause problems later from happening in the house.

Impact of COVID-19 
Because of the COVID-19 pandemic, contestants had to be in quarantine ten days before entering the house. Each housemate was tested four times before participation. Since the housemates had tested negative for COVID-19, they could form a household and did not need to practice social distancing, following the COVID-19 regulations in the Netherlands and Belgium.

Housemates
Despite the announcement that fourteen housemates would enter the house on launch night, it was revealed on 28 December 2020 that during the launch night, only four housemates from the Netherlands and four housemates from Belgium will enter the house.

Non-chosen candidates
After the voluntary exits of Daniëlle, Jowi and Nathalie, the production decided to put new housemates into the house. On Day 32, mysterious pictures of five candidates appeared on the screen inside the house. On Day 34, more additional information about the five candidates revealed to the housemates. On Day 35, Big Brother calls the housemates to the living room and played voice introductions from the five candidates. A photo of each candidate also appears. During the live show on Day 36, the five candidates were finally introduced to the viewers. Housemates had to choose two candidates they like to see entering the house, they were Jerrel and Matt. Unbeknown to the other housemates, the third new housemates would be decided by the viewers among Jeroen, Mike and Mona. On the morning of Day 37, it was revealed that Mike was the third new housemate and entered the house.

Twist

Prize money 
In this season, housemates were required to do several tasks every week. These tasks were known as "secret mission", "challenge" or "weekly tasks". If the housemate(s) completed, they earned prize money for the winner of this season.

Caretaker & house rules 

Every week, the viewers decided who became the Caretaker. The Caretaker can't be nominated for eviction, they can create three house rules for that week and have to manage the grocery budget.

Immunity token
On Day 19, Daniëlle was called to the diary room and she returns with a box. Inside this box was an immunity token. This immunity token was earned during the knitting task. Housemates using this token cannot be eliminated. Daniëlle lied about the meaning of the token by telling her housemates that the housemate would be decided by a joint decision. This confused the housemates and led to nobody using the token. Big Brother eventually took the token back.

Rich and poor
On Day 58, Big Brother divided the housemates into two teams: Female housemates are in Yellow Team and Male housemates are in Green Team. Through a battle, Yellow Team wins the luxury side of the house which includes the living room, kitchen, garden, hot tub and sauna. The Green Team has to live on the poor side which includes the game room, pantry and bedroom. Also, the Green Team is not allowed to enter the rich side. On Day 61, this element ended and the whole house gathered together.

Weekly summary 
The main events in the Big Brother house are summarised in the table below.

Episodes
<onlyinclude>

Nominations table

 Housemates from The Netherlands
 Housemates from Belgium
 Tie-breaker vote

Notes
: Because Naomi won the first immunity challenge, she became immune from eviction.
: Because Jowi was elected as the Caretaker, he cannot be nominated for eviction. Also, he can create three house rules by himself and manage the grocery budget.
: Theo chose to leave the house because he was unhappy during his stay in the house. Due to Theo's voluntary departure, neither Els and René would be evicted. Instead, the nominee who received the fewer votes would be automatically nominated for the next week.
: In Week 4, because Jill was not in the house during the time of nomination, neither was she able to nominate, nor could she be nominated by the other housemates. Jowi was the first to be called to the diary room and was then told that he cannot nominate because he has lost his chance in the caretaker challenge. Furthermore, the nominations resulted in a tie between Julie and Patrick. Caretaker Liese then had to make the decision between the two of them. She chose Patrick to be the second nominee, besides Els.
: On Day 31, Daniëlle, Jowi and Nathalie voluntarily left the house.
: At the end of Week 5, Big Brother gave the housemates information on the five candidates to be new housemates. The candidates were all Dutch (to replace Daniëlle, Jowi and Nathalie). Each housemate had to vote for two out of five candidates they would like to see entering the house. Jerrel and Matt were the two who received the most votes and entered the house at the end of the live show on Day 36. Unbeknown to the other housemates, the third new housemates will be decided by the viewers among Jeroen, Mike, and Mona. On the morning of Day 37, Mike became the third new housemate to enter the house.
: Julie received immunity from Naomi after Naomi won the challenge.
: In this week's nomination, there was a tie between three housemates: Jerrel, Jill, and Nick. Caretaker Zoey had the chance to save one of them from the nomination. She chose to save Jill.
: There was no caretaker for Week 9. Big Brother divided the housemates into two teams: Female housemates are in the Yellow Team and Male housemates are in the Green Team. Through a battle, the Yellow Team wins the luxury side of the house, which includes the living room, kitchen, garden, hot tub, and sauna. The Green Team has to live on the poor side, which includes the game room, pantry and bedroom. Also, the Green Team is not allowed to enter the rich side.
: The female housemates won a game against the male housemates. All of the female housemates were immune from the nominations this week. 
: This week, the housemates did not nominate. Instead, the viewers held all the power to nominate and decide who would be evicted. The viewers nominated Jill, Michel and Zoey.
: On Day 75, there was a dilemma. The first to agree to leave the show on that day will receive €15,000 from the prize money.
: In this week's nomination, there was a tie between four housemates Jill, Julie, Liese, and Naomi. Caretaker Nick had the chance to save one of them from the nomination. He chose to save Naomi.
: Due to Matt's voluntary departure, none among Jill, Julie, and Liese would be evicted. Instead, the nominee who received the fewest votes would be automatically nominated for the next week.
:  Jill and Julie were sent to the White Room.
: For this week's nomination, the housemates were only allowed to nominate one of their fellow housemates. Jill and Julie nominated in the White Room; they each wrote their nomination on a card inside an envelope.
: This week, there was no more caretaker and the viewers voted for who they wanted to see in the finale.
: For the final week, one of the four housemates would be evicted before the finale.
: The public were voting for who they wanted to win, rather than to save.

References

External links
 Big Brother 2021 website
 Dutch official website on RTL
 Belgian official website on Play4

07
Big Brother (franchise)
2020s Belgian television series
2020s Dutch television series
Belgian reality television series
Dutch reality television series
Dutch-language television shows